Chaeopsestis is a monotypic moth genus belonging to the family Drepaninae first described by Ferdinand Le Cerf in 1941. Its single species, Chaeopsestis ludovicae, was described in the same paper. It is found in Vietnam, Thailand and the Chinese provinces of Jiangxi, Fujian, Guangdong and Hainan.

Adults are on wing from October to November. Adults drink the tears of several animals including humans (lachryphagy). The moth attaches itself to the eyelid. It has also been recorded drinking sweat and fluids from the nose.

References

Thyatirinae
Moths described in 1941
Taxa named by Ferdinand Le Cerf
Drepanidae genera
Monotypic moth genera